Slavina Koleva (born ) is a Bulgarian female volleyball player. She is a member of the Bulgaria women's national volleyball team and was part of the Bulgarian national team at the 2014 FIVB Volleyball Women's World Championship in Italy. On club level, she plays for CS Volei Alba-Blaj since 2017.

Clubs
  Saint-Raphaël Var VB (2009–2010)
  Karşıyaka Izmir (2014–2015)
  Calcit Volleyball (2015–2017)
  Sta. Lucia Lady Realtors (2017)
  CS Volei Alba-Blaj (2017–2018)
 Știința Bacău (2018–2019)

References

External links
 2014 FIVB Volleyball Women's World Championship profile
 CEV profile
 
 LNV profile

1986 births
Living people
Sportspeople from Sofia
Bulgarian women's volleyball players
Bulgarian expatriate sportspeople in Romania
Expatriate volleyball players in Romania
Outside hitters
Expatriate volleyball players in France
Expatriate volleyball players in Turkey
Expatriate volleyball players in Slovenia
Expatriate volleyball players in the Philippines
Bulgarian expatriate sportspeople in France
Bulgarian expatriate sportspeople in Turkey
Bulgarian expatriate sportspeople in Slovenia